The 5th constituency of Bouches-du-Rhône is a French legislative constituency in Bouches-du-Rhône.

Deputies

Elections

2022

 
 
 
 
 
 
 
|-
| colspan="8" bgcolor="#E9E9E9"|
|-

2017

2012

|- style="background-color:#E9E9E9;text-align:center;"
! colspan="2" rowspan="2" style="text-align:left;" | Candidate
! rowspan="2" colspan="2" style="text-align:left;" | Party
! colspan="2" | 1st round
! colspan="2" | 2nd round
|- style="background-color:#E9E9E9;text-align:center;"
! width="75" | Votes
! width="30" | %
! width="75" | Votes
! width="30" | %
|-
| style="background-color:" |
| style="text-align:left;" | Marie-Arlette Carlotti
| style="text-align:left;" | Socialist Party
| PS
| 
| 34.43%
| 
| 51.81%
|-
| style="background-color:" |
| style="text-align:left;" | Renaud Muselier
| style="text-align:left;" | Union for a Popular Movement
| UMP
| 
| 32.45%
| 
| 48.19%
|-
| style="background-color:" |
| style="text-align:left;" | Jean Pierre Baumann
| style="text-align:left;" | Front National
| FN
| 
| 16.27%
| colspan="2" style="text-align:left;" |
|-
| style="background-color:" |
| style="text-align:left;" | Frédéric Dutoit
| style="text-align:left;" | Left Front
| FG
| 
| 7.59%
| colspan="2" style="text-align:left;" |
|-
| style="background-color:" |
| style="text-align:left;" | Michèle Rubirola-Blanc
| style="text-align:left;" | Europe Ecology – The Greens
| EELV
| 
| 3.42%
| colspan="2" style="text-align:left;" |
|-
| style="background-color:" |
| style="text-align:left;" | Hélène Coulomb
| style="text-align:left;" | 
| CEN
| 
| 1.64%
| colspan="2" style="text-align:left;" |
|-
| style="background-color:" |
| style="text-align:left;" | Chantal Sebag
| style="text-align:left;" | Other
| AUT
| 
| 0.98%
| colspan="2" style="text-align:left;" |
|-
| style="background-color:" |
| style="text-align:left;" | Mylène Gugliotta
| style="text-align:left;" | Ecologist
| ECO
| 
| 0.55%
| colspan="2" style="text-align:left;" |
|-
| style="background-color:" |
| style="text-align:left;" | François Franceschi
| style="text-align:left;" | Miscellaneous Right
| DVD
| 
| 0.51%
| colspan="2" style="text-align:left;" |
|-
| style="background-color:" |
| style="text-align:left;" | Hubert Fayard
| style="text-align:left;" | Miscellaneous Right
| DVD
| 
| 0.47%
| colspan="2" style="text-align:left;" |
|-
| style="background-color:" |
| style="text-align:left;" | Ahmed Azouaou
| style="text-align:left;" | Ecologist
| ECO
| 
| 0.36%
| colspan="2" style="text-align:left;" |
|-
| style="background-color:" |
| style="text-align:left;" | Michèle Alphonse
| style="text-align:left;" | Miscellaneous Right
| DVD
| 
| 0.35%
| colspan="2" style="text-align:left;" |
|-
| style="background-color:" |
| style="text-align:left;" | Richard Bonacase
| style="text-align:left;" | Far Right
| EXD
| 
| 0.33%
| colspan="2" style="text-align:left;" |
|-
| style="background-color:" |
| style="text-align:left;" | Junie Ciccione
| style="text-align:left;" | Far Left
| EXG
| 
| 0.33%
| colspan="2" style="text-align:left;" |
|-
| style="background-color:" |
| style="text-align:left;" | Corinne Raynaud
| style="text-align:left;" | Far Left
| EXG
| 
| 0.17%
| colspan="2" style="text-align:left;" |
|-
| style="background-color:" |
| style="text-align:left;" | Nathalie Malhole
| style="text-align:left;" | Far Left
| EXG
| 
| 0.14%
| colspan="2" style="text-align:left;" |
|-
| style="background-color:" |
| style="text-align:left;" | Frédéric Boeuf-Salor
| style="text-align:left;" | Ecologist
| ECO
| 
| 0.00%
| colspan="2" style="text-align:left;" |
|-
| colspan="8" style="background-color:#E9E9E9;"|
|- style="font-weight:bold"
| colspan="4" style="text-align:left;" | Total
| 
| 100%
| 
| 100%
|-
| colspan="8" style="background-color:#E9E9E9;"|
|-
| colspan="4" style="text-align:left;" | Registered voters
| 
| style="background-color:#E9E9E9;"|
| 
| style="background-color:#E9E9E9;"|
|-
| colspan="4" style="text-align:left;" | Blank/Void ballots
| 
| 0.94%
| 
| 3.02%
|-
| colspan="4" style="text-align:left;" | Turnout
| 
| 58.84%
| 
| 58.58%
|-
| colspan="4" style="text-align:left;" | Abstentions
| 
| 41.16%
| 
| 41.42%
|-
| colspan="8" style="background-color:#E9E9E9;"|
|- style="font-weight:bold"
| colspan="6" style="text-align:left;" | Result
| colspan="2" style="background-color:" | PS GAIN
|}

2007

|- style="background-color:#E9E9E9;text-align:center;"
! colspan="2" rowspan="2" style="text-align:left;" | Candidate
! rowspan="2" colspan="2" style="text-align:left;" | Party
! colspan="2" | 1st round
! colspan="2" | 2nd round
|- style="background-color:#E9E9E9;text-align:center;"
! width="75" | Votes
! width="30" | %
! width="75" | Votes
! width="30" | %
|-
| style="background-color:" |
| style="text-align:left;" | Renaud Muselier
| style="text-align:left;" | Union for a Popular Movement
| UMP
| 
| 45.70%
| 
| 53.32%
|-
| style="background-color:" |
| style="text-align:left;" | Antoine Rouzaud
| style="text-align:left;" | Radical Party of the Left
| PRG
| 
| 23.12%
| 
| 46.68%
|-
| style="background-color:" |
| style="text-align:left;" | Christophe Madrolle
| style="text-align:left;" | Democratic Movement
| MoDem
| 
| 7.25%
| colspan="2" style="text-align:left;" |
|-
| style="background-color:" |
| style="text-align:left;" | Gilda Mih
| style="text-align:left;" | Front National
| FN
| 
| 6.53%
| colspan="2" style="text-align:left;" |
|-
| style="background-color:" |
| style="text-align:left;" | Jean-Marc Coppola
| style="text-align:left;" | Communist
| PCF
| 
| 5.28%
| colspan="2" style="text-align:left;" |
|-
| style="background-color:" |
| style="text-align:left;" | Sébastien Fournier
| style="text-align:left;" | Far Left
| EXG
| 
| 4.29%
| colspan="2" style="text-align:left;" |
|-
| style="background-color:" |
| style="text-align:left;" | Michèle Rubirola Blanc
| style="text-align:left;" | The Greens
| VEC
| 
| 3.27%
| colspan="2" style="text-align:left;" |
|-
| style="background-color:" |
| style="text-align:left;" | Jean Frizzi
| style="text-align:left;" | Ecologist
| ECO
| 
| 1.54%
| colspan="2" style="text-align:left;" |
|-
| style="background-color:" |
| style="text-align:left;" | Odile Grenet
| style="text-align:left;" | Movement for France
| MPF
| 
| 0.80%
| colspan="2" style="text-align:left;" |
|-
| style="background-color:" |
| style="text-align:left;" | Nathalie Malhole
| style="text-align:left;" | Far Left
| EXG
| 
| 0.77%
| colspan="2" style="text-align:left;" |
|-
| style="background-color:" |
| style="text-align:left;" | Sophie Aime Blanc
| style="text-align:left;" | Far Right
| EXD
| 
| 0.58%
| colspan="2" style="text-align:left;" |
|-
| style="background-color:" |
| style="text-align:left;" | Joël Boeuf
| style="text-align:left;" | Independent
| DIV
| 
| 0.50%
| colspan="2" style="text-align:left;" |
|-
| style="background-color:" |
| style="text-align:left;" | Chantal Pinero
| style="text-align:left;" | Miscellaneous Right
| DVD
| 
| 0.36%
| colspan="2" style="text-align:left;" |
|-
| style="background-color:" |
| style="text-align:left;" | Arlette Cohen Penna
| style="text-align:left;" | Independent
| DIV
| 
| 0.00%
| colspan="2" style="text-align:left;" |
|-
| colspan="8" style="background-color:#E9E9E9;"|
|- style="font-weight:bold"
| colspan="4" style="text-align:left;" | Total
| 
| 100%
| 
| 100%
|-
| colspan="8" style="background-color:#E9E9E9;"|
|-
| colspan="4" style="text-align:left;" | Registered voters
| 
| style="background-color:#E9E9E9;"|
| 
| style="background-color:#E9E9E9;"|
|-
| colspan="4" style="text-align:left;" | Blank/Void ballots
| 
| 1.26%
| 
| 2.85%
|-
| colspan="4" style="text-align:left;" | Turnout
| 
| 57.24%
| 
| 53.80%
|-
| colspan="4" style="text-align:left;" | Abstentions
| 
| 42.76%
| 
| 46.20%
|-
| colspan="8" style="background-color:#E9E9E9;"|
|- style="font-weight:bold"
| colspan="6" style="text-align:left;" | Result
| colspan="2" style="background-color:" | UMP HOLD
|}

2002

 
 
 
 
 
|-
| colspan="8" bgcolor="#E9E9E9"|
|-

1997

 
 
 
 
|-
| colspan="8" bgcolor="#E9E9E9"|
|-

References

5